Blastobasis nephelophaea is a moth in the family Blastobasidae. It was described by Edward Meyrick in 1931. It is found in Taiwan.

References

Blastobasis
Moths described in 1931
Moths of Taiwan
Taxa named by Edward Meyrick